Meet Mr McNutley is a TV series starring Ray Milland that ran from 1953 to 1955 on CBS.

It was also known as The Ray Milland Show.

Premise
A professor works at a college.

Cast
Ray Milland
Gordon Jones
Phyllis Avery

References

External links
Meet Mr McNultey at IMDb

1953 American television series debuts
1955 American television series endings
CBS original programming